Class 3600 are a group of electric locomotives that were operated by Chemins de Fer Luxembourgeois (CFL). They were built to the design of the French BB 12000 class.

These locomotives have lost their duties to the newer class 4000s. Examples are still to be found dumped in yards awaiting their final trip for disposal. Two have been saved:
 3602 Bahnpark museum Augsburg, Germany
 3608 Esch sur Alzette

External links
rail.lu
Spoorgroep Luxemburg

3600
MTE locomotives
25 kV AC locomotives
Bo′Bo′ locomotives
Railway locomotives introduced in 1958
Electric locomotives of Luxembourg
Standard gauge locomotives of Luxembourg